The 2017 Queen's Birthday Honours for Australia were announced on 12 June 2017 by the Governor-General, Sir Peter Cosgrove.

The Birthday Honours were appointments by some of the 16 Commonwealth realms of Queen Elizabeth II to various orders and honours to reward and highlight good works by citizens of those countries. The Birthday Honours are awarded as part of the Queen's Official Birthday celebrations during the month of June.

Order of Australia

Companion (AC)

General Division

Officer (AO)

General Division

Military Division

Member (AM)

General Division

Military Division

Medal (OAM)

General Division

Military Division

Meritorious Service

Public Service Medal (PSM)

Australian Police Medal (APM)

Australian Fire Service Medal (AFSM)

Ambulance Service Medal (ASM)

Emergency Services Medal (ESM)

Distinguished and Conspicuous Service

Distinguished Service Cross (DSC)

Bar to the Distinguished Service Medal (DSM & Bar)

Distinguished Service Medal (DSM)

Commendation for Distinguished Service

Bar to the Conspicuous Service Cross (CSC & Bar)

Conspicuous Service Cross (CSC)

Conspicuous Service Medal (CSM)

References

External links
All pages are from the Governor General's website: http://www.gg.gov.au
Australian Honours Lists
The Queen's Birthday 2017 Honours List
Summaries:
S1 - Order of Australia
S2 - Distinguished and Conspicuous
S3 - Meritorious
Biographical notes:
Companion (AC) in the General Division of the Order of Australia
Officer (AO) in the General Division of the Order of Australia
Member (AM) in the General Division of the Order of Australia (A-L)
Member (AM) in the General Division of the Order of Australia (M-Z)
Medal (OAM) of the Order of Australia in the General Division
Meritorious – PSM, APM, AFSM, ASM & ESM 
Military – Distinguished & Conspicuous

2017 awards in Australia
Orders, decorations, and medals of Australia